Post office or postman's knock is a kissing party game played at teenage parties. It has been referred to in United States popular culture since at least the 1880s.

How to play
The group playing is divided into two groups – typically a girls' group and a boys' group. One group goes into another room, lets say room A, and the other group goes into what is called "the post office." To play, each person from the outer group individually visits "the post office." Once there, they get a kiss from everyone in the room. They then return to room A. 

Once everyone in the first group has taken a turn, the other group begins sending members to the room A, making room A the new post office. This game is usually played by teenagers and is a similar game to 7 minutes in heaven.

Variations 
 In the variation "postman's knock", one person chosen by a group to be the "postman" goes outside and knocks on the door. Another person is chosen by the rest of the group to answer the door, and pays for the "letter" with a kiss. Then another person is chosen to be postman, etc. The game has many variations. In some versions, playing cards are used to select which people get to be postman and which get to be answerer in turn.
 In the variation "pony express", the "post office" is a closet or it is in some other dark room. The game is played the same, but can become more intense. It is described in the 1954 movie Phffft as "...the same as Post Office, but with more 'horsing around'".
 In Sweden, the game is referred to as ryska posten ("Russian mail/post office").

In popular culture
 In Laura Ingalls Wilder's autobiography, Pioneer Girl, she lists games played at teenage parties, including "post office" and "kissing games".

 Published in 1929, Is Sex Necessary?, by James Thurber and E. B. White, refers repeatedly to post office, and to the possibly similar party game Pillow (for example, see p. 43 and pp. 49–50 of the 1964 Dell edition [copyright 1950]).

 In the 1930 Charley Chase comedy short “Whispering Whoopee” Charley hires 3 wild women who play post office with some older gents to try and secure a real estate deal.

 In the 1932 film The Purchase Price, a group of married adults in a farming community have a party (to welcome mail order brides) and play post office. One of the women goes into a separate bedroom and then comes out to the main room and announces that there are x letters and y postcards for [man's name]. The man and woman go into the bedroom, and exchange presumably kisses and hugs, then return to the main room to general hilarity.

 In the 1932 film Huddle, a mixed group of college students in high spirits are talking on a train. One of the young men says, "Let's play post office." One of the young women remarks, "That's a kids' game!" The young man then replies, "Not the way I play it!"  The same gag (which may not have been original even then) is often used subsequently, for example in the 1934 Three Stooges short film Three Little Pigskins and in the 1941 Abbott and Costello film Hold That Ghost. The joke was a recurring one by Abbott and Costello. The joke has been used even in more recent times; in the 2013 film Gangster Squad, where Ryan Gosling's character uses it on Emma Stone's character.

 In the 1936 Three Stooges short film A Pain in the Pullman, when the Stooges are being kicked out of the star's drawing room, Curly says "I thought she wanted to play post office!"

 The game of "post office" is referenced in the 1936 film Postal Inspector.

 In Wallace Stegner's first novel Remembering Laughter (1937), which is set on a farm in Iowa, the plot darkens after a party in which post office is played—the game is a prelude to emotional disaster.

 In the 1938 film There's Always a Woman, Joan Blondell's character attempts to impede a police search of her apartment. As one officer is searching a closet, she asks him what they are looking for and he tells her "A letter", to which she replies "Imagine a big man like you wanting to play post office!”

 In the story "Three Hours Between Planes" by F. Scott Fitzgerald (written in 1939 and published in 1941) post office is mentioned as a game that can cause terrible jealousy among children. 

 In the 1939 film Hell's Kitchen, after Buck Caesar (Stanley Fields) informs the "Dead End Kids" that every Saturday at the home-for-boys at which they live will now be treated as a "holiday," with "some nice, clean, healthy sports," one of the boys stands up and sarcastically says, to the great amusement of the other boys, "Now don't tell us you want us to play post office." 

 In Osa Johnson's 1940 autobiography, I Married Adventure, she writes that her grandmother "was my self-constituted chaperone from the moment she had witnessed a game of kiss-the-pillow at one of my birthday parties..."  (p. 71)

 In the 1941 film Ridin' on a Rainbow, Gene Autry rescues a girl from the river. After returning her to her stateroom on the riverboat, a sailor who followed them in states "Let's get out of here before they start playing post office." 

 Docks of New York, a 1945 East Side Kids film, Huntz Hall questions Leo Gorcey about what an older well-dressed man would've been doing prowling in the back alley carrying a large knife. Scratching his head while trying to unravel the mystery, Leo replies, "He wasn't playin' post office". 

 In a 1948 episode of Lucille Ball's radio show "My Favorite Husband," characters play post office at a teenage dance.

 In the 1950 short film  So You Want to Throw a Party, Joe (George O'Hanlon) and Alice McDoakes are planning on throwing a party. Joe messes up the inviting of guests and at the party the male attendees play post office repeatedly selecting only Alice in to the room to Joe's chagrin.

 In an episode of I Love Lucy called "The Charm School" (aired 25 January 1954), Ethel mentions that Fred suggested they play post office the previous night when a beautiful guest arrived at their dinner party.

 In season 2, episode 2 of The Lucy Show, episode titled "Kiddie Parties Inc." Vivian says she played post office when she was younger

 In a 1954 television episode of The Jack Benny Program with Fred Allen guest-starring, Benny is surprised by Allen hiding in a closet. When Benny demands to know what Allen is doing in the closet, Allen says, "Playing 'post office'.  Kiss me!"

 In a 1954 episode of The George Burns and Gracie Allen Show in which Gracie Allen runs for city council, Gracie speaks to the chief of police.  Near the end of the conversation he shakes her hand and says "It's been a real pleasure".  Gracie replies, "If you think shaking hands is a pleasure, then you've never played post office."  In season 6,episode 26 "A Weekend on Long Island" airing in 1956, it is mentioned twice as a potential party game.

 In the best-selling 1956 novel Peyton Place the 14th birthday party of the main character Allison McKenzie is celebrated with a "kissing game", as "post pffice".

 In a 1957 episode of Leave it to Beaver "Party Invitation", Beaver goes to an all-girl party. One of the girls suggests playing post office.

 In J. D. Salinger's Seymour: An Introduction (1959), Buddy describes himself and his brother as being "homely," as children, and how they were "veteran recipients of bag after bag of unmailed letters", whenever the game was played at children's parties.

 In his unfinished novel Answered Prayers, Truman Capote writes: "Kissing her, according to Dill, was like playing post office with a dead and rotting whale: she really did need a dentist."

 In a 1967 episode of the sitcom Bewitched entitled "I Get Your Nannie, You Get My Goat," Darrin's boss, Larry Tate, disapproves of Darrin and Samantha's kissing in plain view on a patio at a business function for an important advertising client. Insinuating that it could be viewed as unprofessional and therefore embarrassing, Mr. Tate says, "Cut that out. What if somebody sees you?...The somebody I'm talking about, Darrin, is Roy Chappell of Chappell Baby Foods. I want to steer him out here so he can meet you and we can sew up the account. And I don't want him to catch you playing post office".

 In the 1968 film Yours, Mine and Ours, Frank, played by Henry Fonda, is on a date with a younger free-love hippie. The date is interrupted by Helen, played by Lucille Ball. While Frank and Helen commiserate over the problems they have with their respective children, the hippie says, "Why don't you drop me off at the exit, then you two can play Post Office!"

 In the 2002 film Sweet Home Alabama, Melanie, played by Reese Witherspoon, mentions playing a game of post office in high school, during the first meeting with her old friend Bobby Ray, played by Ethan Embry.

 In The Andy Griffith Show (second season) episode called "Bailey's Bad Boy", Barney mentions playing "two-handed post office" at the end of the show.

 In a 1975 episode of All in the Family entitled Edith's Friend, Edith's childhood sweetheart asks her if she remembers playing post office.

 In the 1981 Are You Being Served? Christmas special, "Roots?", in discussing Mr. Grace's upcoming birthday, someone mentions postman's knock, which prompts Mrs. Slocombe to recall, "Me and Mrs. Axleby played Postman's Knock on my birthday last year!"  Mr. Klein remarks, "Aren't you both a little old for Postman's Knock?"  Mrs. Slocombe smiles coyly and says, "The postman didn't think so!"

Earlier, in the season four episode “Oh What A Tangled Web We Weave, Mr. Humphries recalled playing postman’s knock at that year’s Christmas party and getting the night watchman. Mr. Lucas told Mr. Humphries he was lucky, because he wound up with Mrs. Slocum. 

 In Anders Jacobsson's and Sören Olsson's 1986 book Självklart, Sune, Sune and his friends play the game when Sune hosts a party at home for his friends. In 1992, the boardgame Sune och ryska posten was released.

 In the 1991 Bottom episode “Accident”, Richie suggests that he, Eddie, Spudgun and Dave Hedgehog play postman's knock at his birthday party, despite being the only attendees.

 In the 1991 episode of The Cosby Show titled "Attack of the Killer B's" (season 7, episode 15), after Clair talks about how she worked at the post office during her college years, Cliff suggests that they play post office as they are going upstairs. 

 The musical sketch from Two Ronnies' 1993 Christmas special includes various characters from the story Alice in Wonderland parodying common Christmas traditions of the time. The Duchess (Ronnie Barker) quotes the King of Hearts as suggesting the party "play postman's knock again". 

 At a society party in the 2008 film The Loss of a Teardrop Diamond, Jimmy (Chris Evans) is designated postman in a game that arouses jealousy in outcast debutante Fisher Willow (Bryce Dallas Howard).

 In The X-Files seventh season episode "Closure", Mulder and Scully are about to perform a séance and after Scully sarcastically comments that she has not done one since high school, Mulder jokingly suggests that afterwards they should play "postman" and spin the bottle.

References

Kissing games